The Union Block of Mount Pleasant, Iowa, was built by William McCandless in 1861. Historically it was used as offices and by the county courts. In the Union Block in 1869, Arabella A. Mansfield became the first woman in the United States awarded a license to practice law.  The third floor housed the Opera House or Union Hall, a gathering place for the community. Early supporters of women's rights and civil rights spoke there, including Frederick Douglass, Bronson Alcott, Anna Dickinson, and possibly Elizabeth Cady Stanton.
Preservation Iowa had listed Union Block on its most endangered buildings list because of its poor condition and lack of preservation plan. The building was badly damaged by an early morning fire on Jan. 25, 2011.

Preservation Campaign & Restoration
The Union Block Revitalization Committee was formed to raise awareness and funds for the restoration of the Union Block. Money was raised by the people in the community and the building was renovated. It reopened in August 2014 housing businesses on the first and second floors. The ballroom was restored and updated on the third floor making it a beautiful hall used for a variety of community gatherings, events, and private parties.

References

Buildings and structures in Henry County, Iowa
Italianate architecture in Iowa
Commercial buildings completed in 1861
Commercial buildings on the National Register of Historic Places in Iowa
National Register of Historic Places in Henry County, Iowa
1861 establishments in Iowa
Buildings and structures in Mount Pleasant, Iowa